Sussex House School (commonly known as Sussex House), is a boys’ preparatory school located in Chelsea, London. Founded in 1952, the school occupies a house designed by Norman Shaw at 68 Cadogan Square, and since 1994 has operated as an independent charitable trust. It typically has a roll of around 180 pupils.

Affiliated to the Church of England, pupils use nearby St Simon Zelotes as the school chapel. Sussex House has a strong reputation in music and drama and puts on several plays and concerts each year. It offers a variety of sports but is known in particular for its success in fencing. The headmaster maintains links with Eton, KCS Wimbledon, St Paul's, Westminster School, and Winchester College; in any given year around 80 per cent of leavers depart for one of these institutions.

Former pupils are known as Old Cadogans and include actor Daniel Radcliffe, author Edward St Aubyn, gerontologist Aubrey de Grey, and filmmaker Matthew Vaughn.

History
Sussex House School was founded in 1952 and received charitable status in 1994.

Profile
As of October 2019, the school had 184 pupils enrolled. Of these, 28 spoke English as an additional language and 39 were identified as being very academically gifted, for whom the curriculum is modified. A report by the Independent Schools Inspectorate noted that most pupils come from families with professional and business backgrounds who live within a five mile radius of the school; the ability of the pupils is above the national average. It has a full-time staff of 21, supplemented by visiting sports and music staff.

There is a variety of student activities, including an architecture club, whose members go on walking tours of Chelsea, and coding club. Although a number of sports are on offer, such as cricket and football, Sussex House has been especially successful in fencing, and has produced more national champions than any other school in Britain.

A board of trustees is responsible for all aspects of running the school, supported by a team of advisory governors. The headmaster is one of the trustees. Nicholas Kaye, a graduate of Magdelene College, Cambridge, is the current headmaster and was appointed to this role in 1994, having been deputy since 1986.

Admissions
The admissions process comprises an interview and a written exam; the latter is taken in January each year and features questions on English, Maths and verbal reasoning. A report from the previous school is also taken into consideration. In total, 36 boys are admitted each academic year.

The main pre-prep feeders are reportedly Garden House School, Eaton House Belgravia, Redcliffe School, Norland Place School, and Hawkesdown House.

Fees
School fees are charged termly and are payable by the first day of each term. As of 2022, the fee is £8,100 per term, for a total of £24,300 over the three term academic year.

Trustees and governing body
Trustees
J. A. Crewe
Mrs. J. M. Elias M.A.
M. A. J. Goedhuis M.A., M.B.A.
N. P. Kaye M.A., F.R.S.A.
R. T. G. Winter C.B.E., B.A, F.C.A

Governors
J. A. Crewe (Chairman)
Mrs. J. M. Elias M.A.
J. D. Gallant B.A.
Mrs. N. M. Gayner
P. D. Hargreaves M.A.
R. T. G. Winter C.B.E., B.A, F.C.A

Notable former pupils
Former pupils are known as Old Cadogans, after the street on which the school is located.

References

External links
 Official website
 Profile at the Independent Schools Council website

Private boys' schools in London
Preparatory schools in London
Private schools in the Royal Borough of Kensington and Chelsea